Bret Harte was an American author.

Bret Harte may also refer to any of the following, all of which were named for the author:
Bret Harte, California, a census-designated place in Stanislaus County, California
Bret Harte Union High School in Angels Camp, California
Bret Harte Middle School, in the Oakland Unified School District
Bret Harte Middle School,  in the San Jose Unified School District
 Bret Harte Middle School, in the Hayward Unified School District

See also
Bret Hart, Canadian wrestler
Brett Hart (disambiguation)